Articles on the modern history of Germany:
Early Modern history of Germany
18th-century history of Germany
19th-century history of Germany
German Confederation
German Empire
Weimar Republic
Third Reich
History of Germany (1945–90)
History of Germany since 1990